Only a Woman (Swedish: Bara en kvinna) is a 1941 Swedish comedy film directed by Anders Henrikson and starring Karin Ekelund, Arnold Sjöstrand and Karin Kavli. It was shot at the Centrumateljéerna Studios in Stockholm. The film's sets were designed by the art director Bertil Duroj.

Synopsis
A an absent-minded lawyer forgets that it is his wedding anniversary and doesn't come home to the special dinner his wife has prepared. Her friend Maud persuades her to attend a masquerade party in the company of an art professor. When she loses money at cards he agrees to let her off so long as she poses for a portrait.

Cast

 Karin Ekelund as 	Eva Juren
 Arnold Sjöstrand as 	Tore Stenwall
 Anders Henrikson as Ivar Juren
 Karin Kavli as 	Maud Grane
 Eva Henning as 	Anna-Lisa
 Hilding Gavle as 'Cesar'
 Erik Berglund as 	Amos Lundbäck 
 Marianne Löfgren as 	Mrs. Törnestad 
 Hjördis Petterson as 	Mrs. Pettersson
 Olav Riégo as 	Wessman 
 Artur Cederborgh as 	Johansson, guest at the masquerade
 Eivor Engelbrektsson as 	Sigrid, housemaid 
 Mona Mårtenson as 	Journalist
 Yngve Nyqvist as Chief inspector Gustavsson 
 Willy Peters as Andersson, accused 
 Gösta Bodin as 	Napoleon, guest at the masquerade 
 Sven-Bertil Norberg as 	Hellberg, lawyer
 Sickan Castegren as 	Olga Lundbäck
 Georg Skarstedt as District attorney
 Tord Stål as Secretary 
 Hugo Björne Judge 
 Douglas Håge as 	Factory owner 
 Ragnar Widestedt as 	Rural Court Judge 
 Annika Tretow as 	Art student 
 Agda Helin as 	Assistant in flowershop 
 Sven-Eric Gamble as Boy at the newspaper 
 Elsa Ebbesen as 	Cook at the Juréns 
 Eva Dahlbeck as Guest at the masquerade 
 Wiktor Andersson as 	Guest at the masquerade 
 Lillebil Kjellén as 	Dinner guest at the Juréns

References

Bibliography 
 Qvist, Per Olov & von Bagh, Peter. Guide to the Cinema of Sweden and Finland. Greenwood Publishing Group, 2000.

External links 
 

1941 films
Swedish comedy films
1941 comedy films
1940s Swedish-language films
Films directed by Anders Henrikson
1940s Swedish films